Mount Washington is a  peak in the Olympic Mountains of Washington state. The mountain is located in the Mount Skokomish Wilderness.

Climate
Mount Washington is located in the marine west coast climate zone of western North America. Most weather fronts originate in the Pacific Ocean, and travel northeast toward the Olympic Mountains. As fronts approach, they are forced upward by the peaks of the Olympic Range, causing them to drop their moisture in the form of rain or snowfall (Orographic lift). As a result, the Olympics experience high precipitation, especially during the winter months. During winter months, weather is usually cloudy, but, due to high pressure systems over the Pacific Ocean that intensify during summer months, there is often little or no cloud cover during the summer. Because of maritime influence, snow tends to be wet and heavy, resulting in avalanche danger. Precipitation runoff from the mountain drains into the Hamma Hamma River and Skokomish River.

See also
 Mount Skokomish Wilderness
 Olympic Mountains

References

External links
 

Mount Washington (Olympics) at The Mountaineers
 Mount Skokomish Wilderness U.S. Forest Service
 Mount Washington weather: Mountain Forecast

Mountains of Mason County, Washington
Mountains of Washington (state)
Olympic Mountains